Mary Louise Kisler  is a New Zealand curator, author, art historian and Radio New Zealand art commentator. She is best known for her publications which include Angels & Aristocrats: Early European Art in New Zealand Public Galleries (2010) and Finding Frances Hodgkins (2019).

She has been a curator at the Auckland Art Gallery Toi o Tāmaki since 1998 and is now the Senior Curator, Mackelvie Collection, International Art.

Biography
Kisler earned her master's degree in art history and Italian at the University of Auckland in 1994. In 1996 she commenced a PhD at the University on Dis/Ordered Femininity in Italian Renaissance Art.

Kisler's 2010 book Angels & Aristocrats: Early European Art in New Zealand Public Collections brings together artworks from the collections of five New Zealand galleries: Auckland Art Gallery Toi o Tāmaki, Museum of New Zealand Te Papa Tongarewa, Christchurch Art Gallery Te Puna o Waiwhetu, Dunedin Public Art Gallery and Whanganui's Sarjeant Gallery. A touring exhibition with a selection of works from Kisler's book travelled to museums and galleries around New Zealand.

In the 2021 Queen's Birthday Honours, Kisler was appointed a Member of the New Zealand Order of Merit, for services to art history and curation.

Publications
 Everyday Miracles: The art of Stanley Spencer (Dunedin Public Art Gallery, 2003).
 Frances Hodgkins: European Journeys (Auckland University Press, 2019).
 Finding Frances Hodgkins (Massey University Press, 2019).
 Angels & Aristocrats: Early European Art in New Zealand Public Collections (Random House, 2010).

References

Living people
New Zealand art curators
New Zealand art historians
New Zealand women historians
Year of birth missing (living people)
New Zealand women curators
Women art historians
21st-century New Zealand women writers
21st-century New Zealand historians
University of Auckland alumni
New Zealand radio people
New Zealand women radio presenters
Members of the New Zealand Order of Merit